Diplodina may refer to:
 Diplodina (fungus), a genus of fungi in the family Gnomoniaceae
 Diplodina, a genus of butterflies, unresolved taxon, described in 1916 by Schaus
 Diplodina, a genus of protists in the family Urosporidae; synonym of Gonospora